Iván Manolo Lima Magne (born 21 March 1974) is a Bolivian lawyer, professor, and politician serving as the Minister of Justice and Institutional Transparency since 9 November 2020 during the government of Luis Arce. He previously served as a Magistrate of the Supreme Tribunal of Justice from 2014 to 2016, having been elected to succeed William Alave Laura.

References 

 

1974 births
Living people
People from La Paz
Movement for Socialism (Bolivia) politicians
Government ministers of Bolivia
21st-century Bolivian politicians
Justice ministers of Bolivia
Bolivian Catholic University San Pablo alumni